"Your Baby Doesn't Love You Anymore" is a song originally recorded and made a minor hit by Ruby & the Romantics in 1965. It appeared on their Greatest Hits album, and was released as a single on Kapp Records K-665 in April of that year. On The Romantics' original version, the song's composer is listed as Lawrence (Larry) Weiss. Although it was originally a B-side to the standard "We'll Meet Again", "Your Baby" received considerably more R&B radio airplay, but did not reach the Billboard Hot 100, only managing #8 on the Bubbling Under chart.

Carpenters' version
Eighteen years later, in 1983, The Carpenters released a cover version of the song as the second single from their 1983 Voice of the Heart album. The single was the second posthumous release after Karen's death. No video was shot for the song nor has the song ever been performed live by Richard.

Personnel
Karen Carpenter – lead vocals
Richard Carpenter – backing vocals, keyboards
Joe Osborn – bass guitar
Ron Tutt – drums
Tony Peluso – guitar
Chuck Findley – trumpet
Peter Limonick – percussion
Earle Dumler – oboe

Charts
The Carpenters

Ruby & The Romantics' original version

Personnel
Ruby & the Romantics
 Lead vocals by Ruby Nash 
 Backing vocals by Leroy Fann, Ed Roberts, Ronald Mosely, and George Lee
 Song written and composed by Lawrence Weiss
 Orchestra arranged and conducted by Alan Lorber
 Produced by Tom Catalano

References

External links
 Your Baby Doesn't Love You Anymore-Original Recording by Ruby & The Romantics (1965) YouTube Video

The Carpenters songs
1983 singles
1965 songs
Songs written by Larry Weiss
A&M Records singles
Ruby & the Romantics songs
1965 singles